Selydove (formerly: Selydivka) is a city of oblast significance in Donetsk Oblast, Ukraine. The city is located in the western part of the region, on the Solona River (a tributary of the Volchya, Dnieper basin).

History
The city takes its roots from a sloboda Selydivka that was confirmed by the Bakhmut Province chancellery in 1782.

Municipality
Beside the city of Selydove, part of Selydove municipality are cities Hirnyk and Ukrainsk as well as towns of Vyshneve, Hostre, Komyshivka, Kurakhivka, and Tsukuryne.

Demographics 
As of the 2001 Ukrainian census:

Ethnicity
 Ukrainians: 59.3%
 Russians: 36.7%
 Belarusians: 1.1%
 Tatars: 0.5%
 Greeks: 0.4%

References

Cities in Donetsk Oblast
Bakhmutsky Uyezd
Cities of regional significance in Ukraine
Populated places established in the Russian Empire
Pokrovsk Raion